Algerino may refer to:

L'Algérino (born 1981), French rapper of Algerian origin
Jimmy Algerino (born 1971), French soccer player
 Slang expression to describe someone from Scarborough, North Yorkshire

See also
Algerine (disambiguation)